The 1970 1000 km of Brands Hatch was an endurance race held at the Brands Hatch circuit in Kent, England, United Kingdom on April 12, 1970. The race was the 3rd round of the 1970 World Sportscar Championship season.

Pre-race
The challenging, bumpy and undulating Brands Hatch circuit near London saw New Zealander Chris Amon return temporarily to Ferrari to drive one of their 512's, and he qualified his car on pole position. Amon's fellow countryman Denny Hulme drove a works Porsche 917K with factory driver Vic Elford. This race was only for prototypes; no GT cars were allowed to enter.

Race
On the day of the race, the conditions were made awful by heavy rain, wind and cold air- a common occurrence during spring in England. The race started with Elford, Jacky Ickx in another works Ferrari, Jo Siffert in works/John Wyer Porsche 917K all getting past Amon around the outside of Paddock Hill, and Amon was followed by Piers Courage in a works Alfa Romeo, Pedro Rodríguez in the other John Wyer Porsche and the rest of the field followed.

At the end of the first lap, Barrie Smith in a privately entered Lola crashed heavily on the pit straight, and yellow flags were shown at the site of the accident. Rodriguez, who passed cars while yellow flags were being shown (oblivious to the fact), was shown the black flag and went into the pits while an astonishing 2nd, was reprimanded. Ickx, like Rodriguez- was a wet-weather specialist, had passed Elford and was leading the race. But he soon went into the pits with rain-wiper motor failure.

Elford was back in the lead, but the flying Rodriguez, who had come up from coming out of the pits in 12th to 2nd by lap 15 (only about 25 minutes into the race), passed Elford and led the race. This was a lead he kept until the end; he and Elford drove their cars for 5 1/2 of the 6 1/2 hours of the race in the dreadful conditions, and Rodriguez won the race by 5 laps. Porsches romped home 1-2-3-4; the first 3 being 917K's. Rodriguez' performance was such that the race is sometimes known as "the day they forgot to tell Pedro it was raining".

The running of the race was changed from a 6 hour time limit to a 1000 kilometer overall distance.

Official results

Did Not Finish

Statistics
Pole position: #2 SpA Ferrari SEFAC Ferrari 512S Spyder (Chris Amon/Arturo Merzario)- 1:28.6 (107.723 mph/174.081 km/h)
Time taken for winning car to cover distance: 6 hours 45 minutes 29.6 seconds
Average Speed: 148.296 km/h (91.540 mph)
Weather conditions: Heavy rain, windy, cold

References

1000 km Brands Hatch
Brands Hatch
Brands Hatch